SoChange is a non-governmental organization (NGO) based in Oakville, Ontario, Canada, that was founded in 2008 with the stated intention of inspiring individuals and organizations to work towards the tangible quality-of-life improvements for those who are currently disenfranchised.

History 

SoChange was founded in 2008 by comedian David Peck originally from Toronto, Ontario. Among its projects have been the Mosquitoes Suck Tour, about malaria prevention; Dreamriders, a scholarship program for youth in Malawi; and the YChange Conference, which has treated themes such as climate change and religious tolerance.

Activities 

To date, event planning has constituted a large share of the organization’s activity base.

The organization participated in the Spread the Net campaign by piloting a third-party fundraising event, entitled the "Mosquitoes Suck: The Tour," at a high school in Guelph, Ontario.

SoChange has also assisted in grant writing, educational and awareness raising activities, and project design.

References 

Political advocacy groups in Canada
Social responsibility organizations